Raquel Len Pennington (born September 5, 1988) is an American mixed martial artist who competes in Ultimate Fighting Championship women's featherweight division. She has previously fought for Invicta Fighting Championships. As of January 17, 2023, she is #2 in the UFC women's bantamweight rankings, and as of February 27, 2023, she is #13 in the UFC women's pound-for-pound rankings.

Early life
Pennington grew up playing many sports from basketball, softball, volleyball, running cross country and always wanted to box. She graduated from Harrison High School in 2007 as secretary of the National Honors Society, with many athletic and academic scholarships. She never played sports on a collegiate level due to a broken back.

Mixed martial arts career

Early career
Pennington started training in martial arts at the age of 19, though initially her parents would not let her fight. She fought in amateur MMA from 2009 to 2011, amassing a record of 7 wins and 1 loss with five of those wins by submission. Her professional debut was in March 2012, a TKO victory against Kim Couture.

Invicta Fighting Championships
Pennington made her Invicta Fighting Championships promotional debut against future The Ultimate Fighter team mate Sarah Moras on July 28, 2012 at Invicta FC 2. She won via unanimous decision.

Her next two fights for the promotion were both losses; one to Cat Zingano at Invicta FC 3 and one to Leslie Smith at Invicta FC 4.

The Ultimate Fighter
In August 2013, Pennington was announced as a cast member of The Ultimate Fighter: Team Rousey vs. Team Tate. She defeated veteran Tonya Evinger via submission due to a guillotine choke in the second round and was the third female pick of Team Tate.

Raquel Pennington faced Jessamyn Duke in the elimination round. Pennington defeated Duke via unanimous decision (29–28, 29–28, and 29–28) and the performance earned both participants Fight of The Season honors.

Advancing to the semi-final, Pennington next faced former boxing champion Jessica Rakoczy in the final episode of the series. Prior to the fight, Pennington damaged her hand but was still able to fight. She lost a unanimous decision to Rakoczy (30–27, 30–27, and 30–27).

Ultimate Fighting Championship
Pennington made her promotional debut against TUF 18 team mate Roxanne Modafferi on November 30, 2013 at The Ultimate Fighter 18 Finale. She won via unanimous decision (30–27, 30–27, and 29–28).

For her second fight with the promotion, Pennington replaced an injured Julianna Peña against Jéssica Andrade on March 15, 2014 at UFC 171. She lost the back-and-forth fight via split decision.

Pennington was scheduled to face Holly Holm at UFC 181 on December 6, 2014.  However, Holm pulled out of the fight in mid-November, citing a neck injury. Holm was replaced by UFC newcomer Ashlee Evans-Smith. Pennington won the fight via technical submission due to a bulldog choke at the end of the first round. She became the 4th fighter in UFC history to finish a fight with that move.

Pennington fought Holly Holm at UFC 184 on February 28, 2015, a bout that was originally supposed to take place at UFC 181. She lost the fight via split decision.

Pennington was set to take on Liz Carmouche at UFC 191. Carmouche was then replaced by former opponent Jéssica Andrade. Pennington won the fight by submission in the second round. The submission earned her a Performance of the Night bonus.

Pennington faced former UFC Bantamweight Champion and former TUF Coach Miesha Tate at UFC 205 on November 12, 2016. She won the fight by unanimous decision (29–28, 30–27, and 30–27), outstriking and outwrestling Tate for all three rounds.

After being away from fighting for about a year and a half, Pennington faced Amanda Nunes on May 12, 2018 at UFC 224 in a UFC Women's Bantamweight Championship bout. Pennington lost the fight via TKO in the fifth round. This was the first event in UFC history to be headlined by two openly gay fighters.

Pennington returned at UFC Fight Night 139 on November 10, 2018 where she took on former UFC featherweight champ Germaine de Randamie. She lost the fight via unanimous decision.

Pennington faced Irene Aldana on July 20, 2019 at UFC on ESPN 4. She won the fight via split decision.

Pennington was scheduled to face Holly Holm on October 6, 2019 at UFC 243. However, on September 27, it was revealed Holm withdrew from the bout due to a hamstring injury and the bout was cancelled. The pair was rescheduled to fight on January 18, 2020 at UFC 246. She lost the fight via unanimous decision.

Pennington faced Marion Reneau on June 20, 2020 at UFC Fight Night: Blaydes vs. Volkov. She won the fight via unanimous decision.

Pennington accepted a six-month USADA suspension after self-reporting a doping violation upon realizing she had ingested banned substances, 7-Keto-DHEA and AOD-9064, prescribed by her doctor to treat a medical condition. The suspension was retroactive to November 17, 2020 and she would be eligible to fight again on May 7, 2021.

Pennington faced Pannie Kianzad  on September 18, 2021 at UFC Fight Night 192. She won the fight via unanimous decision.

Pennington was scheduled to face Julia Avila on December 18, 2021 at UFC Fight Night 199.  However, Avila was forced to pull from the event due to injury. She was replaced by Macy Chiasson. At the weigh-ins, Chiasson weighed in at 148.5 pounds, 3.5 pounds over the women's featherweight non-title fight limit. The bout proceeded at a catchweight with Chiasson fined a percentage of her purse, which went to Pennington. Pennington won the fight via guillotine submission in the second round.

Pennington faced Aspen Ladd, replacing Irene Aldana, on April 9, 2022 at UFC 273. She won the bout via unanimous decision.

Pennington faced Ketlen Vieira on January 14, 2023, at UFC Fight Night 217. She won the fight via split decision.

Pennington is scheduled to face Irene Aldana in a rematch on March 25, 2023, at UFC on ESPN 43.

Personal life
Pennington is openly lesbian. She is married to UFC Strawweight Tecia Torres.

Accomplishments
Ultimate Fighting Championship
The Ultimate Fighter 18 Fight of the Season 
 Performance of the Night (One time) vs. Jéssica Andrade
 Most bouts in UFC Women's Bantamweight division history (16)
 Most total fight time in UFC Women's Bantamweight division history (3:52:33)
 Second most wins in UFC Women's Bantamweight division history (11)
 Most decision wins in UFC Women's Bantamweight division history (9)
 Most decision bouts in UFC Women's Bantamweight division history (13)
 Most significant strikes landed in UFC Women's Bantamweight division history (922)
 Most total strikes landed in UFC Women's Bantamweight division history (1310)
 Tied (Ketlen Vieira) for most split decision wins in UFC Women's Bantamweight division history (3)

Mixed martial arts record

|-
|Win
|align=center|15–8
|Ketlen Vieira
|Decision (split)
|UFC Fight Night: Strickland vs. Imavov
|
|align=center|3
|align=center|5:00
|Las Vegas, Nevada, United States
|
|-
|Win
|align=center|14–8
|Aspen Ladd
|Decision (unanimous)
|UFC 273
|
|align=center|3
|align=center|5:00
|Jacksonville, Florida, United States
|
|-
|Win
|align=center|13–8
|Macy Chiasson
|Submission (guillotine choke)
|UFC Fight Night: Lewis vs. Daukaus
|
|align=center|2
|align=center|3:07
|Las Vegas, Nevada, United States
|
|-
|Win
|align=center|12–8
|Pannie Kianzad
|Decision (unanimous)
|UFC Fight Night: Smith vs. Spann 
|
|align=center|3
|align=center|5:00
|Las Vegas, Nevada, United States
|
|-
|Win
|align=center|11–8
|Marion Reneau
|Decision (unanimous)
|UFC on ESPN: Blaydes vs. Volkov 
|
|align=center|3
|align=center|5:00
|Las Vegas, Nevada, United States
|
|-
|Loss
|align=center|10–8
|Holly Holm
|Decision (unanimous)
|UFC 246 
|
|align=center|3
|align=center|5:00
|Las Vegas, Nevada, United States
| 
|-
|Win
|align=center|10–7
|Irene Aldana
|Decision (split)
|UFC on ESPN: dos Anjos vs. Edwards 
|
|align=center|3
|align=center|5:00
|San Antonio, Texas, United States
|
|-
|Loss
|align=center|9–7
|Germaine de Randamie
|Decision (unanimous)
|UFC Fight Night: The Korean Zombie vs. Rodríguez 
|
|align=center|3
|align=center|5:00
|Denver, Colorado, United States
|
|-
|Loss
|align=center|9–6
|Amanda Nunes
|TKO (punches)
|UFC 224
|
|align=center|5
|align=center|2:36
|Rio de Janeiro, Brazil
|  
|-
|Win
|align=center|9–5
|Miesha Tate
|Decision (unanimous)
|UFC 205
|
|align=center|3
|align=center|5:00
|New York City, New York, United States
|
|-
|Win
|align=center|8–5
|Elizabeth Phillips
|Decision (unanimous)
|UFC 202
|
|align=center|3
|align=center|5:00
|Las Vegas, Nevada, United States
|
|-
|Win
|align=center|7–5
|Bethe Correia
|Decision (split)
|UFC on Fox: Teixeira vs. Evans
|
|align=center|3
|align=center|5:00
|Tampa, Florida, United States
|
|-
|Win
|align=center|6–5
|Jéssica Andrade
|Submission (rear-naked choke)
|UFC 191
|
|align=center|2
|align=center|4:58
|Las Vegas, Nevada, United States
|
|-
|Loss
|align=center|5–5
|Holly Holm
|Decision (split)
|UFC 184
|
|align=center|3
|align=center|5:00
|Los Angeles, California, United States
|
|-
|Win
|align=center|5–4
|Ashlee Evans-Smith
|Technical Submission (bulldog choke)
|UFC 181
|
|align=center|1
|align=center|4:59
|Las Vegas, Nevada, United States
|
|-
|Loss
|align=center|4–4
|Jéssica Andrade
|Decision (split)
|UFC 171
|
|align=center|3
|align=center|5:00
|Dallas, Texas, United States
|
|-
|Win
|align=center|4–3
|Roxanne Modafferi
|Decision (unanimous)
|The Ultimate Fighter: Team Rousey vs. Team Tate Finale
|
|align=center|3
|align=center|5:00
|Las Vegas, Nevada, United States
|
|-
|Loss
|align=center|3–3
|Leslie Smith
|Decision (unanimous)
|Invicta FC: Esparza vs. Hyatt
|
|align=center|3
|align=center|5:00
|Kansas City, Kansas, United States
|
|-
|Loss
|align=center|3–2
|Cat Zingano
|Submission (rear-naked choke)
|Invicta FC: Penne vs. Sugiyama
|
|align=center|2
|align=center|3:32
|Kansas City, Kansas, United States
|
|-
|Win
|align=center|3–1
|Raquel Pa'aluhi
|Submission (guillotine choke)
|Destiny MMA: Na Koa 1
|
|align=center|1
|align=center|3:52
|Honolulu, Hawaii, United States
|
|-
|Win
|align=center|2–1
|Sarah Moras
|Decision (unanimous)
|Invicta FC: Baszler vs. McMann
|
|align=center|3
|align=center|5:00
|Kansas City, Kansas, United States
|
|-
|Loss
|align=center|1–1
|Tori Adams
|Decision (unanimous)
|RMBB/TB: A Champion's Quest
|
|align=center|3
|align=center|5:00
|Sheridan, Colorado, United States
|
|-
|Win
|align=center|1–0
|Kim Couture
|TKO (knees to the body)
|MFP: Vengeance
|
|align=center|2
|align=center|2:25
|Casper, Wyoming, United States
|

|-
|Loss
|align=center |2–1
|Jessica Rakoczy
|Decision (unanimous)
|rowspan=3|The Ultimate Fighter: Team Rousey vs. Team Tate
|
|align=center|3
|align=center|5:00
|rowspan=3|Las Vegas, Nevada, United States
|Semifinal bout.
|-
|Win
|align=center |2–0
|Jessamyn Duke
|Decision (unanimous)
|
|align=center|3
|align=center|5:00
|Quarterfinal bout.
|-
|Win
|align=center |1–0
|Tonya Evinger
|Submission (guillotine choke)
|
|align=center|2
|align=center|3:56
|Preliminary bout.

|-
|Win
|align=center|7–1
|Heather Denny
|Submission (triangle choke)
|RMBB - Extreme MMA
|
|align=center|2
|align=center|1:59
|Sheridan, Colorado, United States
|
|-
|Win
|align=center|6–1
|J.J. Aldrich
|Submission (triangle choke)
|RMBB - Bad Girlz Gone Wild
|
|align=center|2
|align=center|1:44
|Sheridan, Colorado, United States
|
|-
|Loss
|align=center|5–1
|Taylor Stratford
|Decision (split)
|URC 13 - Brute Force
|
|align=center|3
|align=center|3:00
|Reno, Nevada, United States
|
|-
|Win
|align=center|5–0
|Tsui-Jen Cunanan
|Decision (unanimous)
|RMBB - Caged Madness
|
|align=center|3
|align=center|3:00
|Sheridan, Colorado, United States
|
|-
|Win
|align=center|4–0
|Kyane Hampton
|Submission (rear-naked choke)
|NMEF / RMBB - Annihilation 20: Clash of the Titans 5
|
|align=center|2
|align=center|0:45
|Greeley, Colorado, United States
|
|-
|Win
|align=center|3–0
|Kyane Hampton
|Submission (rear-naked choke)
|Kickdown 67 - Blast
|
|align=center|1
|align=center|2:52
|Denver, Colorado, United States
|
|-
|Win
|align=center|2–0
|Ericka Trujillo
|Decision (unanimous)
|Kickdown 62 - Extreme
|
|align=center|3
|align=center|3:00
|Casper, Wyoming, United States
|
|-
|Win
|align=center|1–0
|Staci Vega
|Submission (guillotine choke)
|Kickdown 60 - Supremacy
|
|align=center|1
|align=center|1:45
|Casper, Wyoming, United States
|

See also
 List of current UFC fighters
 List of female mixed martial artists

References

External links
 
 

1988 births
Living people
American female mixed martial artists
Female Brazilian jiu-jitsu practitioners
American mixed martial artists of Mexican descent
American practitioners of Brazilian jiu-jitsu
American LGBT sportspeople
Lesbian sportswomen
LGBT mixed martial artists
Bantamweight mixed martial artists
Mixed martial artists utilizing boxing
Mixed martial artists utilizing Brazilian jiu-jitsu
University of Colorado Colorado Springs alumni
LGBT people from Colorado
LGBT Hispanic and Latino American people
Ultimate Fighting Championship female fighters
LGBT Brazilian jiu-jitsu practitioners
21st-century American women